Simon Unwin (born 1952) is a British architect and writer.

Life
He was born in 1952 in Yorkshire, but grew up in Wales.

He studied at the Chelsea School of Art in London and the Welsh School of Architecture in Cardiff. From the Welsh School of Architecture, he obtained a PhD, and he went on to become a senior lecturer there.

From 2004 to 2009, he was Professor of Architecture at the University of Dundee, where he is now an emeritus professor.

He currently resides in Cardiff.

Work
Unwin has written several books about architecture:

An Architecture Notebook: Wall (2000) 
Doorway (2007) 
Exercises in Architecture: Learning to Think as an Architect (2012) 
Analysing Architecture (fourth edition, 2014) 
Twenty-Five Buildings Every Architect Should Understand (2015; first published in 2010 as Twenty Buildings Every Architect Should Understand) 
The Ten Most Influential Buildings in History: Architecture's Archetypes (2016) 
Children as Place-makers: The Innate Architect in All of Us (2019) 
Curve: Possibilities and Problems with Deviating from the Straight in Architecture (2019) 
Metaphor: An Exploration of the Metaphorical Dimensions and Potential of Architecture (2019) 

In Twenty-Five Buildings Every Architect Should Understand, he analyses the following buildings:

References

Architects from Yorkshire
British architecture writers
Alumni of the Welsh School of Architecture
Academics of the University of Dundee
1952 births
Living people